ActivTrak is a cloud-based workforce analytics software provider. The company was founded in 2009 by Birch Grove Software and is headquartered in Austin, Texas. The company has raised US$77.5 million in funding and is backed by Sapphire Venture and Elsewhere Partners.

History 
ActivTrak was founded in 2009 by Herb Axilrod and Anton Seidler in Dallas, Texas. ActivTrak's first on-demand software product launched in 2012, and the workforce analytics platform launched in 2015. It now uses data sourced from more than 9,500 customers and 550,000 users.

In 2019, ActivTrak raised $20 million in a Series A round of funding with Elsewhere Partners, a growth-stage venture capital firm that principally invests in B2B startups. Rita Selvaggi assumed the role of CEO.

In 2020, ActivTrak raised $50M in a Series B round of funding with Sapphire Ventures and Elsewhere Partners. The company also introduced the ActivTrak Productivity Lab, which offers resources to help users understand workforce analytics and productivity metrics.

Product 
ActivTrak is a workforce analytics and productivity platform that provides insights into workforce productivity through reports, dashboards, and data analysis.

The ActivTrak platform uses machine learning (AI) to collect and analyze user activity data and generate insights about workforce productivity. ActivTrak natively supports Windows, Mac, Chrome, Terminal Services, and VDI.

The ActivTrak Agent runs in the background while collecting data, executing responses to user activity, and sensing mouse and keyboard movement in the active window(s) of the user's device. All data is collected and stored in a dedicated ActivTrak Database that aggregates the data based on the user's request. Using data analytics, the Database generates account and team benchmarks and identifies productivity patterns and outliers.

Awards 

 In August 2021, ActivTrak ranked 1606 on the Inc. 5000 Fastest Growing Private Companies in America.
In April 2021, ActivTrak was named "Business Intelligence Solution Provider of the Year" by the Data Breakthrough Awards.
 In January 2021, ActivTrak won the 2021 "Best Feature Set," "Best Customer Support," and "Best Usability Awards" from TrustRadius.
In December 2020, ActivTrak won the Brandon Hall Group Silver Medal for Excellence in Technology.
In November 2020, ActivTrak ranked 480 on Deloitte's 2020 Technology Fast 500 North America.
 In October 2020, ActivTrak was named PCMag Editors' Choice for "Best Employee Monitoring Software".
 In October 2019, ActivTrak was named "User Behavior Analytics Platform of the Year" by CyberSecurity Breakthrough.

In the news 

 ActivTrak is listed in Gartner's Hype Cycles for Human Capital Management and Digital Workplace.
 ActivTrak launches ActivTrak Coach.
 Andrea Tharp, ActivTrak's Director of Worldwide Channels, is featured on CRN's 2021 Woman of the Channel List.
ActivTrak launches ActivTrak Premium.

See also 
 Time Doctor
 Toggl

References

External links 
 Official website

Time-tracking software